Hot pot or hotpot, also known as soup-food or steamboat, is a dish whereby a heat source placed on the dining table keeps a pot of soup stock simmering, and a variety of Chinese foodstuffs and ingredients are served beside the pot for the diners to put into the hot stock.

Description
Hot pot is a flavorful broth traditionally served inside a large metal pot. The broth is brought to a boil and left simmering for the duration of the meal. Raw ingredients, such as meat and vegetables, are placed into the simmering broth and thus cooked.  The cooked pieces are dipped into dipping sauces for additional flavor. Hot pot is considered a main course and is usually served without rice or noodles on the side. Hot pots can be prepared and eaten at home or in a restaurant. 

Typical hot pot ingredients include thinly sliced meat, leaf vegetables, mushrooms, vermicelli, sliced potatoes, bean products, egg dumplings, tofu, and seafood. Raw ingredients are pre-sliced into thin sections that will cook quickly and consistently in the simmering broth, which is kept at a gentle boiling temperature. Most raw foods can be cooked in a hot pot, although they may have different cooking times, and must be immersed in the soup and then removed accordingly.

At the conclusion of the meal, the broth would have acquired many flavors from the added ingredients and may be served to the diners after turning off the heat source.

History 
The tripods of Zhou dynasty may be the earliest prototypes of the hot pot. Diners among the nobility each had a personal pot made of bronze, and called ran lu (/燃爐). The main part of ran lu was a small stove with a small pot above burning charcoal. Later, a hot pot made with copper was created during the "Three Kingdoms period" (200–280 AD), which is generally acknowledged as the origin of the hot pot.
During the Qing dynasty, hot pot became popular among the emperors. In particular, the Qianlong Emperor was very fond of hot pot and would eat it for almost every meal. Later, the Jiaqing Emperor also had a banquet with 1,550 hot pots at his coronation. Empress Dowager Cixi was also known to have enjoyed hot pot, especially in the winter months.

Since the 1990s, as the number of Chinese immigrants entering the United States has grown significantly, Chinese food has also spread to the United States, and hot pot has also moved to the forefront of the global culinary scene.

Common ingredients

Regional variations

East Asia

Greater China

Mainland China

Chinese hot pots are often divided into "Southern style" and "Northern style", paralleling the cultural regions of China.  Although there are wide regional variations, in general, Southern styles tend to have spicy broths, complex dipping sauces and are heavier on seafood, vegetables and mushrooms, while Northern styles are simpler and focus more on the meat, particularly mutton.

According to research, 67 different spices and condiments are commonly used in traditional Chinese hotpot, involving 82 plant species of 50 genera in 26 families.

Modern eateries offer a partitioned pot with differently-flavored broths in each section. More traditional or older establishments often serve a fragrant, mild broth in a large brass vessel heated by burning coals in a central chimney. The broth is simmered in a deep, donut-shaped bowl surrounding the chimney.

Southern styles
One of the most famous Southern variations is the Chongqing hot pot (Chinese: 重庆火锅), which uses mala seasoning flavored with chilli peppers and Sichuan pepper for a spicy and numbing flavor.  Chongqing hotpots often feature a wide variety of different meats and ingredients, and offer many sauces and condiments to flavor the meat. The typical dipping sauce contains sesame oil and is mixed with crushed fresh garlic and chopped spring onions. Due to the high humidity in the region, local people eat spicy food to remove the moisture from their bodies.

Sichuan also has a number of "dry" hot pots such as mala xiangguo (Chinese: 麻辣香锅), which are similar to mala hot pot in ingredients and seasoning, but stir-fry them instead of cooking in broth.

In neighbouring Yunnan, although spicy broths are equally popular, there is another predominant type of hot pot that is made with various wild or farmed mushrooms. It is called the Wild Mushroom hot pot. Due to the vast forests and abundant natural resources in Yunnan, people can find a wide variety of edible mushrooms. The easily accessible and fresh mushroom resources lead to the high popularity of the Wild Mushroom hot pot. The big difference between the mushroom hot pot and the spicy hot pot is that the former omits strong spice and chili, and the latter preserves the original flavor of the mushrooms. The mushroom hot pot is also seasonal, depending on the availability of local mushrooms.

A Cantonese variation includes mixing a raw egg with the condiments to reduce the amount of "heat" absorbed by the food, thereby reducing the likelihood of a sore throat after the steamboat meal, according to Chinese herbalist theories.

In Hainan cuisine hot pot is generally served in small woks with a prepared broth containing pieces of meat. At the time of serving, the meat is not fully cooked, and approximately fifteen minutes are required before it is ready to eat. Items supplied to be cooked in this type of hot pot include mushrooms, thinly-shaved beef or goat meat, lettuce, and other green vegetables. This dish varies somewhat in different parts of the province. Coconut milk and juice is commonly added into the hot pot.

In Jiangsu and Zhejiang cuisine, chrysanthemum flowers are cooked in the broth to give it a floral essence.

Northern styles
Instant-boiled mutton could be viewed as representative of "northern style hot pot", which focus on the main ingredients rather than the soup base. Water is used as the main ingredient of the hotpot instead of the flavored broth. 

The Manchu hot pot uses plenty of suan cai (Chinese sauerkraut) to make the broth sour.

In Hubei cuisine, hot pot is normally prepared with hot spices and Sichuan pepper. Items supplied to be cooked in this broth include mushrooms, thinly-shaved beef or lamb, lettuce, and various other green vegetables.

Taiwan
In Taiwanese cuisine, it is very common to eat hotpot food with a dipping sauce consisting of shacha sauce and raw egg yolk with stir-fried beef. (沙茶牛肉炉). One of the most authentic hotpot restaurants that locals widely praise is a hotpot restaurant called “Xiao Haozhou's sha-cha beef hot pot.” This restaurant was founded in 1949 by a man named Musheng Chen. The popularity of this hot pot restaurant and its unique secret recipe of sha-cha sauce has become one of the iconic sha-cha sauce brands in Taiwanese cuisine nowadays. Initially, this hotpot is only assorted with a light broth and dip with sha-cha source. Influenced by Japanese cuisine, the sha-cha source is now commonly served with raw egg yolk.

The Taiwanese also developed their Taiwanese style of chili hotpot originated from the Sichuan chili hotpot style. In the Taiwanese style of chili hotpot, people who barely tolerate spicy favor are included. Rather than using animal offal as the main ingredient, the Taiwanese style of chili hotpot uses seafood and beef as their main ingredient due to Taiwan's location near the sea.

In Taiwan, people usually have a hotpot meal during the Chinese Lunar New Year's Eve. Different from the usual days of cooking hotpots with whatever ingredients they like, the Taiwanese follow the principles of Wu-Xing (the five-element principle) when cooking the Lunar year Taiwan hotpot. They believe that by following the current principle of these five elements, then the food they eat can gain a “mutual generation sequence” (xiangsheng 相生) that is beneficial to the ones that eat them. In Taiwanese hotpot, these five elements are represented with the food in five colors: white, black, yellow, red, and green. Therefore, the five indispensable foods are

 stew turnip, which represents white;
 mushroom, which represents black;
 burdock or pumpkin, which represents yellow;
 carrot or tomato, which represents red and reddish leaves, which represent green.

Moreover, locals believe that the more color there are shown in a hotpot, the more different nutrients they will gain from eating it. The reason why it is so crucial for Taiwanese people to consume hot pot during the Lunar year is that hot pot not only represents rich nutrition and blessings for family health, but it also represents family reunion and harmony.

Japan

In Japan, hot pots are known as nabemono.  There are many variations, including sukiyaki, yosenabe, shabu-shabu, oden, and chankonabe.

Korea 
There are two main Korean styles of hotpot, Jeongol (전골) and Budae Jjigae (부대찌개). Both hotpot have similar spicy broth, loaded with Kimchi, spam, sausages, vegetables and noodles.

Southeast Asia

Cambodia
In Cambodian cuisine, hot pot is called yao hon (យ៉ាវហន), though some regions call it chhnang pleurng (ឆ្នាំងភ្លើង), which literally translates to "pot fire". It is usually eaten during celebrations or family gatherings. Just like the Chinese version, Cambodian hot pot consist of similar ingredients although the dish differs in that coconut milk is used as the base of the soup. Another variation of the dish is called "buttered yao hon" or "buttered chhnang pleurng"; the same ingredients are used but are instead cooked on a flat grill pan where butter is used as the base (this is similar to Korean barbecue). An herb sauce is usually added to "buttered yao hon", since the ingredients are not flavored by immersion in a broth.

Philippines
In Philippine cuisine, hotpot is commonly served by Chinese specialty restaurants, and in some all-you-can-eat buffets. The terms shabu-shabu and "hotpot" are also used interchangeably for this style of food preparation. In Cebu City, a specialty restaurant offers a "hot pot" that is literally a huge ceramic pot filled with cooked rice, choice of beef, pork, or chicken slices, special sauce, and choice vegetables such as broccoli, carrot, shallot, ginger, pechay, kangkong leaves, spices, and some slices of hard-boiled eggs on top; it is more similar to kamameshi than the namesake.

Thailand

In Thai cuisine, hotpot is called Thai suki, although it is quite different from the Japanese shabu-shabu variation called sukiyaki. Originally a Chinese-style hot pot, the number of ingredients to choose from was greatly increased and a Thai-style dipping sauce with chili sauce, chilli, lime, and coriander leaves was added. Another variation is mu kratha, the Thai hot pot which originated from Korean barbecue combined with Thai suki. In the Northeast region, a similar style of cooking called chim chum where thinly sliced meat is cooked in clay pots on charcoal stove is also popular. Tom Yum is a common soup base for Thai hot pot.

Vietnam

In Vietnamese cuisine, a hot pot is called lẩu or cù lao. There are many styles of lẩu ranging from seafood lẩu hải sản, canh chua soup-base (lẩu canh chua) or salted fish hot pot (lẩu mắm).

Europe

Switzerland

In Swiss cuisine, a variation of the traditional Chinese hot pot locally called fondue chinoise (lit. "Chinese fondue") is a popular Christmas meal. Various types of meat, fish and vegetables are boiled in a shared pot of broth. Various sauces and pickled condiments are provided on the side. After all the diners have finished cooking, they eat the now well-flavored broth often combined with thin noodles.

Similar dishes 

 Instant-boiled mutton
 Jeongol - Korea
 Sinseollo
 Nabemono - Japan
 Shabu-shabu
 Sukiyaki
 Oden
 Chankonabe
Yao Hon (យ៉ាវហន) or Chhnang Pleurng (ឆ្នាំងភ្លើង) - Cambodia
Buttered Chhnang Pleurng
 Thai suki
 Mu kratha – also called "Thai hot pot" or mookata
 Clay pot cooking – referred to as "hot pot" or "hotpot" on Chinese restaurant menus in English-speaking regions
 Lancashire hotpot – a dish referred to as "hot pot" (or "hotpot") in Britain
 Stew – may include similar ingredients but is not necessarily cooked the same way
 Yong tau foo
 Fondue Bourguignonne and Fondue chinoise

See also

 Buffet
 Fondue
 List of Chinese dishes
 List of stews

References

Further reading

External links

A blog related to Chinese Hot pot at G Adventures
An article related to Hot pot at WikiHow

Beijing cuisine
Cantonese cuisine
Chinese inventions
Chongqing cuisine
Communal eating
Hong Kong cuisine
Japanese cuisine
Jin dynasty (1115–1234)
Korean cuisine
Sichuan cuisine
Stews
Table-cooked dishes
Yunnan cuisine